Public holidays in northern Cyprus are often shared with Turkey. The public holidays include:

In addition, the following Muslim holidays are observed as public holidays:

External links
 Holiday listing

 
Turkish Cypriot culture
Northern Cyprus
Law of Northern Cyprus